"It Might Be Time" is a song by Australian psychedelic music project Tame Impala. It is the tenth track on the 2020 studio album The Slow Rush, and was released as its second single on 28 October 2019. The song was written by Kevin Parker, who performed all instruments and vocals.

Triple J ranked it 43rd in the Triple J Hottest 100 of 2019.

At the APRA Music Awards of 2021, the song was shortlisted for Song of the Year.

Background 
"It Might Be Time" is focused on aging and maturity. Writing for Forbes, Caitlin Kelley, described "It Might Be Time" as: "an ode to ephemerality, as [Parker] confronts the aging process. It would almost be a rude awakening if his words didn't dissipate in a dreamy haze of reverb. As he put it in an Instagram caption, "this quirky new song [is] about your own inner paranoid thoughts telling you you've lost your mojo."

Critical reception 
Lars Brandle, writing for Billboard, described the song as a "dreamy" and "slow" song.

Claire Shaffer, writing for Rolling Stone, called "It Might Be Time" a combination of Kevin Parker's idiosyncratic space music sound, with "a propulsive drumbeat, plunking piano line and screeching, siren-like guitar riff."

Kelley, writing for Forbes said that while the topic of the song is a departure from previous works, the song itself "isn’t a huge departure from his past discography." Kelley further said that the single is "a fitting entry in the spacey psych-pop that made Tame Impala one of the biggest rock bands in the world."

Charts

Certifications

References

External links
 

2019 singles
2019 songs
Tame Impala songs
Songs written by Kevin Parker (musician)